National Highway 1A (NH 1A) was a National Highway in North India that connected the Kashmir valley to Jammu and the rest of India. The northern terminal was in Uri in Jammu and Kashmir and the southern terminal was in Jalandhar. Stretches of old NH 1A ran through some extremely treacherous terrain and shut-offs because of avalanches or landslides common in Winter months. The famous Jawahar Tunnel that connects Jammu with the Kashmir Valley across the Pir Panjal Range falls en route. The total length of NH 1A was 663 km.

New tunnels on the road were planned to reduce the distance between the two cities by 82 km and the travel time by two-thirds. Most of these tunnels such as Dr. Syama Prasad Mookerjee Tunnel and new Banihal double_road_tunnel have been executed and commissioned.

Renumbering
NH 1A number now does not exist and old NH 1A is now a part of new   NH 1 and  NH 44 after renumbering of all national highways in the year 2010.

National Highways Development Project
Approximately stretch of NH 1A from Srinagar to Jalandhar is a part of the North-South Corridor.

See also 
 Mughal Road
 Leh-Manali Highway
 List of National Highways in India (by Highway Number)
 National Highways Development Project

References

External links
 Old NH 1A on OpenStreetMap
 NH 1A Map

1A
1A
1A
1A
National highways in India (old numbering)
Transport in Jalandhar